A list of films produced in the Soviet Union in 1939 (see 1939 in film).

1939

See also
1939 in the Soviet Union

External links
 Soviet films of 1939 at the Internet Movie Database

1939
Soviet
Films